'Abd al-Rahman al-Kawakibi (-c.1902) was a Syrian author and Pan-Arab solidarity supporter. He was one of the most prominent intellectuals of his time; however, his thoughts and writings continue to be relevant to the issues of Islamic identity and Pan-Arabism. His criticisms of the Ottoman Empire eventually led to Arabs calling for the sovereignty of the Arab Nations, setting the basis for Pan-Arab nationalism. Al-Kawakibi articulated his ideas in two influential books, Tabai al-Istibdad wa-Masari al-Isti’bad (طبائع الإستبداد ومصارع الإستعباد)(The Nature of Despotism) and Umm Al-Qura (Mother of All Villages).  He died in 1902 of “mysterious” causes. His family alleged that he was poisoned by Turkish agents.

Early life
Al-Kawakibi was born in Aleppo to an influential Syrian family. He received a thorough education in the Islamic sciences and the languages of the region including Arabic, Turkish and Persian. As a young man, Al-Kawakibi was very interested in literature and politics, having edited Furat, the official paper of Aleppo from 1875 to 1880. at the age of twenty-two al-Kawakibi had been appointed as editor of Aleppo's official newspaper. He also edited the highly influential reformist journal, al-Manar, which was started by Rashid Rida, another influential Islamic scholar.

Career
After working at Furat and al-Manar, Al-Kawakibi started his own literary journal called the al-Sahba. The journal vehemently criticized the despots and dictators of his time, and alluded to the tyranny of the Ottoman Empire. He especially focused his criticism on the new Vali of Aleppo, Jamil Pasha. Due to Al-Kawakibi's political outspokenness, the journal was shut down by the local Ottoman Government after only 15 issues.  
After his work as editor, Al-Kawakibi entered politics more directly, and worked for various positions in the Ottoman civil service in Aleppo. Despite his opposition to the Ottoman Empire, Al-Kawakibi wanted to serve Arabs. During this point in his career, he became an honorary member of the board of lawyer examinations.  Al-Kawakibi, along with other Aleppans, complained about the Vali to the central government in Istanbul. These criticisms fell on deaf ears until Istanbul sent a representative to Aleppo to investigate, and immediately threw Kawakibi and his followers into prison for false complaints.  Once released from prison, Al-Kawakibi's popularity rose and he became the mayor of Aleppo in 1892.
Later on Al-Kawakibi went to Istanbul to study the Ottoman Empire's despotism and problematic leadership more extensively. With his newfound knowledge, he returned to Aleppo and began working for the Ottoman government again.  Because of his opinions, he was subject to harassment and intimidated on a regular basis. He decided to publish his book Umm al-Qura (The Mother of Cities:Mecca) in Egypt, rather than in Syria, and finally left his home country in 1899, moving to Egypt where he was welcomed by other Islamic intellectuals residing there.

Al-Kawakibi was influenced by the teachings of Jamal al-Din al-Afghani as well his disciple Muhammad Abduh. Al-Afghani preached Pan-Islamic identity – with this as his basis, Al-Kawakibi went one step further, incorporating Al-Afghani's theories into Pan-Islamic Arabic solidarity. Another contemporary of Al-Kawakibi was the Islamic scholar and advocate for Arab independence, Sayyid Rashid Rida who was based in Egypt at the same time. Rida and Al-Kawakibi discussed ideas of Pan-Arabism as well as Quranic interpretations. Al-Kawakibi believed that Arabs should be representatives of Islam, not the Ottomans. Rida believed that blind-following(taqlid) was the reason for downfall of Muslims. They both advocated the revival of independent Islamic thinking(ijtihad).

Ideas
Al-Kawakibi, in his earlier writings, was careful not to specifically criticize the Ottoman rulers, but rather critiqued despots and imperialists in general, though his implied target was clear. In one of his most influential books Tabai al-Istibdad wa-Masari al-Isti’bad (The Nature of Despotism), he argues that tyranny violated Islamic teachings and that tyrants were responsible for Muslim nations' weakness and struggle. Al-Kawakibi believed that the demise of the Muslims in the Arab world was due to the oppressive rule of the Ottoman Empire. He was a vocal opponent of the Sultan of the Ottoman Empire and believed that the Sultan had no right to control the Arab people. Al-Kawakibi said that, “If I had an army at my command I would overthrow Abdulhamid’s (Sultan of the Ottoman Empire) government in 24 hours”. He also invoked Prophet Muhammad's sayings in order to rally people behind his cause.  He also believed that the Arabs were united unlike other Muslims and that there was no racial or sectarian segregation among Arabs. He stated that Arabs were, “of all nations the most suitable to be an authority in religion and an example to the Muslims; the other nations have followed their guidance at the start and will not refuse to follow them now.”  

According to Elizabeth F. Thompson, a historian of social movements and liberal constitutionalism in the Middle East at American University in Washington D.C., Al-Kawakibi's thoughts on Islamic democracy influenced an entire generation of Arab reformers. Al-Kawakibi published a newspaper in his hometown, Aleppo, that promoted equal rights for Armenians, Christians, and Jews. The truest expression of Islamic politics was democracy, Al-Kawakibi claimed, as long as it was based on the brotherhood and unity of Arabs regardless of religion and ethnicity.

Al-Kawakibi believed that there were a few reasons beyond the Ottoman's influence for the decline of Muslims at the time period. He believed that imitation (taqlid) caused the Muslims to be stagnant when it came to their religion and other forms of knowledge. Instead, of continuously trying to interpret the Quran and hadiths, Muslims relied on interpretations from centuries ago. Other reasons for the decline of Muslims were he believed, that Muslims abandoned Islamic values and relied on superstitions, and also that they disregarded science and, by extension, were not able to keep up with modern society. However, Al-Kawakibi noted that the tyrannical nature of regimes was the root cause of the struggle of Arabs. The Ottomans prohibiting Arabs from education and imposing foreign rules, established in Istanbul, on Arabs under the control of the Ottoman empire only elevated the position of the Turks and kept the other Muslims, especially Arabs in the dark. He believed that religion was used as an excuse by the Ottomans to unfairly rule over Arabs and other Muslims without understanding the cultural and local customs. 

Al-Kawakibi additionally believed that Mecca should be the capital of the Islamic world, not Istanbul. He was a proponent of historical Arab exceptionalism as the founding location of Islam. He believed that the rightful Caliph should come from the Quraysh tribe as Prophet Muhammad did. His book Umm Al Qura (The Mother of Villages) reflects these ideas. His book contained a fictional story of an Islamic conference taking place in Mecca, thus illustrating the importance of Mecca to the Islamic world.

Criticism
Al-Kawakibi's ideas were controversial to some. His critics alleged that he was a proponent of socialism.  According to author Charles Tripp, the idea of “Islamic socialism” was advocated by Al-Kawakibi.  Islamic socialism is the belief that the Quran permits redistribution of wealth, although that point is disputed by many Muslim scholars.  Another common criticism was that Al-Kawakibi disregarded Islam as the focal point of one's life and marginalized the religion because he believed that Caliphs should have no real political power, but be a spiritual guide. However, that criticism seems to have been unfounded, as Al-Kawakibi was, in writing and action, a very religious man.

Legacy
Although Al-Kawakibi did not have a tremendous amount of support during his lifetime, his ideas influenced entire future generations of Arab reformers and leaders, such as Faisal I, the king of the Arab Kingdom of Syria or Greater Syria in 1920 and King of Iraq from 23 August 1921 until his death. Additionally, Al-Kawakibi's message and legacy passed onto Pan-Arab nationalists such as Gamal Abdel Nasser, even though Al-Kawakibi was not a Pan-Arab nationalist but instead believed in Arab unity and solidarity. 

According to the contemporary Lebanese historian, social commentator, and writer, Gan Dayah, Al-Kawakibi was a Muslim political pioneer due to his ideas championing the separation of state and religion. 

The Kawaakibi Foundation is named after him. Kawakibi's great-grandson, Salam Kawakibi, is a Paris-based intellectual and the director of the Arab Centre for Research and Policy Studies, who has co-published a collection of Kawakibi's essays "On Despotism" in French. For their virulent attacks on 'Abdul Hamid II and the autocratic rule of the Ottomans, ‘Abd al-Rahman al-Kawakibi, alongside the Syrian Islamic reformer Sayyid Rashid Rida (d. 1935), remain influential cultural icons in pan-Arab circles.

Death
Al-Kawakibi died in 1902 and many of his family and supporters alleged that he had been poisoned by Turkish agents. However, this has never been proven. Following Al-Kawakibi's death, the Ottomans were able to confiscate and destroy all but two books, The Nature of Tyranny and Umm Al-Qura, written by Al-Kawakibi.

References

 Goldschmidt, Arthur and Lawrence Davidson. A Concise History of the Middle East, Eighth edition. pages 207–208. Westview Press: Boulder, Colorado 2005. 
 Haim, Sylvia, ed. "Arab Nationalism: An Anthology" Berkeley: University of California Press, 1962.
 Khayr al-Din al-Zirikli, "al-A'lam"
 http://english.aljazeera.net/focus/arabunity/2008/01/2008525184242106402.html
 Haim, Sylvia G. "al-Kawākibī, ʿabd al-raḥmān b. aḥmad b. masʿūd." Encyclopaedia of Islam, Second Edition
 Jomier, J. "al-Manār." Encyclopaedia of Islam, Second Edition. 
 Khatab, Sayed & Bouma, Gary D., “Democracy in Islam”, 2007, Routledge, New York, NY.
 http://archive.arabnews.com/?page=5&section=0&article=13389&d=13&m=3&y=2002
 Tauber, Elizer, “Three Approaches, One Idea: Religion and State in the Thought of 'Abd al-Rahman al-Kawakibi, Najib 'Azuri and Rashid Rida”, British Journal of Middle Eastern Studies Vol. 21, No. 2 (1994), pp. 190–198 
 Dawisha, “Arab Nationalism in the Twentieth Century: From Triumph to Despair”, 2003, Princeton University Press, Princeton, NJ
 Tauber, Elizer Islam and the challenges of democracy, Moneyclips, May 5, 1994
 Dawisha, “Arab Nationalism in the Twentieth Century: From Triumph to Despair”, 2003, Princeton University Press, Princeton, NJ
 Rahme, Joseph, “‘ABD AL-RAḤMĀN AL-KAWĀKIBĪ'S REFORMIST IDEOLOGY, ARAB PAN-ISLAMISM, AND THE INTERNAL OTHER Journal of Islamic Studies (1999) 10 (2): 159-177
 Interpretations of Kawakibis Thought, Middle Eastern Studies Vol. 32, No. 1 (Jan., 1996), pp. 179-190
 Tripp, Charles, “Islam and the moral economy: the challenge of capitalism“, Cambridge University Press, 2006
 Hanna, Sami A.; George H. Gardner (1969). Arab Socialism: A Documentary Survey. Leiden: E.J. Brill. p. 273.

External links

See also
Al-Kawakibi Democracy Transition Center

Syrian Arab nationalists
Arab nationalists
Syrian writers
Arabs from the Ottoman Empire
People from Aleppo
Muslims from the Ottoman Empire
Philosophers from the Ottoman Empire
Ottoman Arab nationalists
19th-century writers from the Ottoman Empire
20th-century writers from the Ottoman Empire
Mujaddid
1854 births
1902 deaths
Muslim socialists